Bradley Howard Friedel (born May 18, 1971) is an American professional soccer coach and former player who played as a goalkeeper.

Friedel played 84 games for the United States national team between 1992 and 2005, and represented his country at three FIFA World Cup tournaments. He is the current holder of the Premier League record for most consecutive appearances with 310, a feat he achieved during spells at Blackburn Rovers, Aston Villa and Tottenham Hotspur. Until he was left out of the Tottenham team on October 7, 2012, the last Premier League games Friedel missed were Blackburn's final two fixtures of the 2003–04 season against Tottenham and Birmingham City, on May 10 and 15, 2004, respectively.

Friedel is also officially Aston Villa's oldest-ever player, a record he set on February 1, 2011, by playing in the club's Premier League fixture away at Manchester United. Friedel's age of 39 years and 259 days surpassed the previous record held by Ernie Callaghan, who last played for Villa against Grimsby Town in April 1947, aged 39 years and 257 days. Friedel's last appearance for Villa was on May 22, 2011, in a 1–0 home win against Liverpool, aged 40 years and four days.

On May 6, 2012, Friedel also became the oldest player to appear in a competitive match for Tottenham when he played in the club's Premier League fixture at Aston Villa, beating Jimmy Cantrell's near-80-year-old record. He ended his Premier League career after a total of 450 appearances, which remains a record for any North or South American player.

Youth and college career
Born in Lakewood, Ohio, Friedel grew up in Bay Village, where he attended Westerly Elementary School, Bay Middle School and Bay High School. Growing up, Friedel played several sports, including soccer, basketball and tennis, and excelled at all three. He earned Bay High's Outstanding Athlete of the Year award in 1989. As an All-State basketball player in Ohio, he was invited to try out as a walk-on for UCLA's basketball team in 1990. He began as a forward on his youth soccer team before moving into goalkeeping. Friedel graduated from Bay High in 1989. In 2007, he was inducted into the Bay High Hall of Fame.

Friedel played college soccer at the University of California, Los Angeles (UCLA). In 1990, he kept goal for the Bruins to the NCAA championship. He was selected as the first team All-American goalkeeper in 1991 and 1992, and won the Hermann Trophy in 1993 as the top collegiate soccer player. He played 66 games for the UCLA, all of which he started. Soccer America magazine named Friedel to its College Team of the Century.

Professional career

Early career
Friedel left UCLA early to pursue a professional career. He began by attempting to sign with Nottingham Forest under Brian Clough, but was denied a work permit, the first in several such failed attempts to move to England. Following a brief trial in Scotland with Celtic, 

Friedel was signed by manager Kevin Keegan of Newcastle United, but again was denied a work permit. While awaiting approval from the British authorities, he practiced with Newcastle as an on-loan player from the USSF.

Friedel joined Danish Superliga club Brøndby IF in the spring of 1995. He stayed with that club for several months in 1995, as back-up to Mogens Krogh. Friedel remained with Brøndby until he returned to the U.S. to rejoin the national team, then preparing for the 1995 U.S. Cup and Copa America.

After the two tournaments, Friedel attempted a third time to join an English club, this time Sunderland. While awaiting a decision regarding his latest application for a work permit, Friedel spent time training with League of Ireland side St. Patrick's Athletic, who were managed at the time by Brian Kerr, a friend of Sunderland manager Peter Reid's. When Friedel again failed to receive a British work permit, his agent negotiated a $1.1 million transfer from the USSF to leading Turkish team Galatasaray in 1995. Galatasaray were managed by Friedel's future Blackburn Rovers manager Graeme Souness. In July 1996, following the end of the Turkish season, Friedel moved to the Columbus Crew of Major League Soccer (MLS). In February 1997, he signed a three-year contract with the Crew as he was named the team's starter. That season, he was selected to the MLS Best XI and named the MLS Goalkeeper of the Year.

Liverpool
Friedel completed a transfer to Liverpool, worth £1.7 million, in 1997. On December 23, 1997, Liverpool gained a work permit for Friedel on appeal after the first request was denied. He made his debut against Aston Villa on February 28, 1998. While Friedel had some initial success with the Reds, he soon had a difficult time, managing just over 30 games in almost three years, including two appearances in the UEFA Cup, as he sat behind first David James and later Sander Westerveld.

Blackburn Rovers

Friedel was signed to Blackburn Rovers by Graeme Souness on a free transfer in November 2000 after a work permit was secured. Joining during Rovers' promotion-winning 2000–01 season, Friedel's consistently-assured performances helped ensure Blackburn's return to the Premiership and then consolidate their top division status in the following seasons.

Friedel's memorable performances for Blackburn include playing against Tottenham Hotspur in the League Cup Final in early 2002, when he was named Man of the Match as he helped Rovers lift the cup. In a 2–1 win over Arsenal at Highbury, Friedel made several immense saves and was only beaten by a deflected free kick. A stunning performance away at Southampton prompted Gordon Strachan to liken him to Superman: "Friedel must have got changed in a telephone box. I wouldn't be surprised if when he takes his shirt off there's a blue jersey with an 'S' on underneath it."

At the end of the 2002–03 season, Friedel's 15 clean sheets earned him Blackburn's Player of the Year award, as well as selection to the Premiership Starting XI. On February 21, 2004, in an away game against Charlton Athletic, Friedel scored a goal from open play in the 90th minute, from a corner kick. Friedel's goal equalized the game at 2–2, but seconds later Charlton scored again through Claus Jensen, and went on to win the match 3–2. He became just the second goalkeeper in Premier League history (excluding own goals) to score, after Peter Schmeichel for Aston Villa in 2001.

Friedel extended his contract with Blackburn Rovers on April 14, 2006, stating his love for the club as a reason. Two years later, on February 5, 2008, he again signed an extension to his Rovers contract, stating that, "I am delighted to have extended the agreement. It was not a difficult decision to make. Blackburn Rovers is home to me. This is my club and I have a special affinity with it." He would, however, leave the club at the end of that season to join Aston Villa, just two league appearances short of Terry Gennoe's club record of 289 for a goalkeeper.

In February 2019 he was one of the first seven players to be inducted into the club's Hall of Fame.

Aston Villa

Friedel had asked Blackburn for permission to let him speak with Aston Villa if an offer was accepted, with Manchester City reportedly interested in signing the American. The club accepted a transfer bid for Friedel, thought to be in the region of £2.5 million, subject to Blackburn themselves having a bid accepted for a replacement goalkeeper. Villa held talks with Friedel on July 25, and he signed a three-year contract with Villa the day after. He was unveiled at half-time during Villa's Intertoto Cup match against Odense, and made his debut against Reading on August 2 at the Madejski Stadium; just ten minutes in, the hosts were awarded a penalty, which Friedel then saved. His competitive debut came in the UEFA Cup second qualifying round, first leg, against Hafnarfjorður away from home. Villa won the match 4–1. Friedel played his first league match for Villa on August 17, 2008, the first match for Villa in the 2008–09 season, in which Villa beat Manchester City 4–2 at home.

He broke the record for continuous games played in the Premier League on November 30, 2008, after his 167th finished in a 0–0 draw with Fulham. He was sent off against former club Liverpool at Anfield by referee Martin Atkinson. Liverpool were awarded a penalty that Steven Gerrard converted against Villa's second-choice goalkeeper, Brad Guzan, who was interestingly another American keeper named Brad and was also signed in the same season as Friedel. Friedel's red card, which he received on the Sunday beforehand, was overturned by the FA on March 24, meaning that he was able to continue his streak of consecutive Premiership appearances. On January 16, 2011, he reached the landmark of 250 consecutive league games. Friedel became the oldest player ever to play for Villa following their 3–1 loss to Manchester United on February 1.

Tottenham Hotspur
Friedel's contract with Aston Villa expired after the 2010–11 season. On June 3, 2011, Tottenham Hotspur announced that they had signed Friedel on a two-year deal. On August 22, 2011, Friedel started in goal for Tottenham at Old Trafford against Manchester United, after Tottenham's first home fixture of the season against Everton the previous week was rescheduled due to rioting in North London. This meant that Friedel further extended his run of consecutive games in the Premier League after his transfer from Aston Villa. During the 2011–12 campaign, Friedel also became the oldest player to make an appearance in the Premier League.

The arrival of the French national team's goalkeeper and captain, Hugo Lloris, to the end of the 2012 summer transfer window cast some doubt on Friedel's status as Tottenham's first-choice goalkeeper for the 2012–13 season. However, following an impressive display by Friedel against Norwich on September 1, 2012, manager André Villas-Boas said that Friedel would remain number one. Friedel's run of 310 consecutive Premier League games was ended on October 7, 2012, when he was named on the bench behind Lloris against Aston Villa. Friedel, however, returned in goal for the next match on October 20, 2012, against Chelsea.

On December 26, 2012, it was announced that Friedel had signed a new contract with Spurs, keeping him at the club until 2014.

Following Lloris' failure to fully recover from a head injury, Friedel returned to the starting lineup in a league match on November 10, 2013, but was unable to prevent Tottenham from losing 1–0 to Newcastle United, with the winning goal being scored by Loïc Rémy.

On June 9, 2014, Friedel signed a one-year contract extension with Tottenham, which would keep him at the club until 2015. In addition, Friedel also became a club ambassador, focusing on Tottenham's presence in the United States, a role he continues to serve as. On May 14, 2015, Friedel announced that he would be retiring at the end of the 2014–15 season.

International career
Friedel is the fourth-most capped goalkeeper in U.S. national team history, and gained his first international cap against Canada in 1992, a game in which he managed to keep a clean sheet. He was the first-choice goalkeeper for the U.S. 1992 Olympic team; however, he was unable to beat out Tony Meola as first-choice keeper for the U.S. team at the 1994 World Cup. His chance came, and Friedel made his World Cup debut, in the 1998 World Cup, where he conceded one goal as the U.S. lost to Yugoslavia. He lived up to his growing reputation in the 2002 World Cup as the U.S. went on a surprising run to the quarter-finals, which included a 3–2 victory over Portugal in group play, and a 2–0 second-round win over arch-rival Mexico before a loss to Germany (the eventual runner-up). He also became the second keeper (after Jan Tomaszewski) to save two penalty kicks during regular play (as opposed to penalty shootouts) in a World Cup finals tournament. He was dubbed "The Human Wall" by fans during the spectacular 2002 World Cup run.

Friedel announced his retirement from international soccer on February 7, 2005.

Media career
Brad Friedel was a studio pundit for BBC's 2014 World Cup coverage in Brazil on both television and BBC Radio Five Live, later appearing on RTÉ's coverage in Ireland after returning home. For the 2014–15 season, he appeared on BBC's Match of the Day and Setanta Sports.

Management career

United States U19
On January 5, 2016, Friedel was named the United States under 19s head coach. He won the 2017 CONCACAF U-20 Championship as assistant coach of the U.S. team with Tab Ramos and Omid Namazi.

New England Revolution
On November 9, 2017, Friedel was named head coach of the New England Revolution, replacing Jay Heaps who was fired by the club in September 2017.

On May 9, 2019, Friedel was fired by the Revolution after a 12-21-13 career record and a 2-8-2 record to open the 2019 season.

Personal life
Though raised in the midwestern state of Ohio, Friedel developed a slight English accent after having lived in the north of that country for more than a decade. "The English don't think I have an accent at all. They think I sound American. And Americans think I sound English. I think I'm caught in the middle."

Friedel is a fan of the NFL's Cleveland Browns, which former Aston Villa Chairman Randy Lerner owned until August 2012.

Friedel also names former American international goalkeeper Tim Harris as his all-time soccer hero. Friedel credits Harris as "the person who started my journey."

In 2007, Friedel launched a non-profit soccer academy in Lorain, Ohio, at a cost of approximately $10 million, providing coaching on a full-tuition scholarship basis to youths aged 12 and older. Premier Soccer Academy had difficulty retaining and obtaining corporate sponsorship after the 2008 financial crisis, however, and closed in 2011. In January of that year, Friedel filed for bankruptcy protection in the United Kingdom as a result of debts arising from the academy.

Career statistics

Club

Managerial career

Honors
Galatasaray
Turkish Cup: 1995–96

Blackburn Rovers
Football League Cup: 2001–02

United States
FIFA Confederations Cup third place: 1999

Individual
Hermann Trophy: 1992
MLS Goalkeeper of the Year Award: 1997
U.S. Soccer Athlete of the Year: 2002
Alan Hardaker Trophy: 2002
Most clean sheets in the Premier League: 2002–03
PFA Premier League Team of the Year: 2002–03
Barclays Premier League Merit Award: 2008–09
IFFHS Best Goalkeepers of the 21st Century: 30th
Soccer America College Team of the Century

References

External links

 
 Brad Friedel at tottenhamhotspur.com
 
 LFChistory.net player profile
 

1971 births
1993 CONCACAF Gold Cup players
1993 Copa América players
1994 FIFA World Cup players
1995 Copa América players
1996 CONCACAF Gold Cup players
1998 CONCACAF Gold Cup players
1998 FIFA World Cup players
1999 FIFA Confederations Cup players
2000 CONCACAF Gold Cup players
2002 FIFA World Cup players
All-American men's college soccer players
American expatriate sportspeople in England
American soccer players
Association football goalkeepers
Aston Villa F.C. players
Blackburn Rovers F.C. players
Brøndby IF players
Columbus Crew players
Footballers at the 1992 Summer Olympics
Footballers at the 2000 Summer Olympics
Galatasaray S.K. footballers
Liverpool F.C. players
Living people
Major League Soccer players
NCAA Division I Men's Soccer Tournament Most Outstanding Player winners
Newcastle United F.C. players
Olympic soccer players of the United States
Sportspeople from Lakewood, Ohio
Premier League players
Soccer players from Ohio
Sportspeople from Cuyahoga County, Ohio
Süper Lig players
English Football League players
Tottenham Hotspur F.C. players
UCLA Bruins men's soccer players
United States men's international soccer players
United States men's under-23 international soccer players
Major League Soccer broadcasters
Hermann Trophy men's winners
Danish Superliga players
Pan American Games gold medalists for the United States
Pan American Games medalists in football
Medalists at the 1991 Pan American Games
Footballers at the 1991 Pan American Games
National Soccer Hall of Fame members
American expatriate sportspeople in Denmark
American expatriate sportspeople in Turkey
American expatriate soccer players
Expatriate footballers in England
Expatriate footballers in Turkey
Expatriate footballers in Denmark